The Southampton Itchen by-election of 27 May 1971 was held after the Speaker of the House of Commons and Member of Parliament (MP) Horace King retired. The seat was gained by the Labour Party (although King had initially sat as a Labour MP). The by-election was noted for the strong performance of the far right National Democratic Party, who had developed a following in the constituency.

Results

References

Southampton Itchen by-election
Southampton Itchen by-election
Southampton Itchen by-election
By-elections to the Parliament of the United Kingdom in Hampshire constituencies
Elections in Southampton
1970s in Southampton